Sheo Narain (14 July 1913 – 11 November 1987) was an Indian politician. He was elected to the Lok Sabha, lower house of the Parliament of India from Basti Uttar Pradesh in 1967 and 1977 .He was earlier elected in 1962 to the Lok Sabha from the Bansi Lok Sabha constituency . He was the Minister for State for Railways Under Morarji Desai from 1977 to 1979. He was earlier elected to the Uttar Pradesh Legislative Assembly and Legislative council .
 Narain died in Basti on 11 November 1987, at the age of 74.

References

External links
Official Biographical Sketch in Lok Sabha Website

1913 births
1987 deaths
India MPs 1962–1967
India MPs 1967–1970
India MPs 1977–1979
Uttar Pradesh MLAs 1957–1962
Uttar Pradesh MLAs 1952–1957
Indian National Congress (Organisation) politicians
Bharatiya Lok Dal politicians
Janata Party politicians